Madhav Avsh (born 19 December 1992) is an Indian cricketer. He made his Twenty20 debut for Arunachal Pradesh in the 2018–19 Syed Mushtaq Ali Trophy on 27 February 2019.

References

External links
 

1992 births
Living people
Indian cricketers
Arunachal Pradesh cricketers
Place of birth missing (living people)